Thaumastochilus is a spider genus of the family Zodariidae, containing two known species from South Africa.

Species
Thaumastochilus martini Simon, 1897 (South Africa)
Thaumastochilus termitomimus Jocqué, 1994 (South Africa)

References

Endemic fauna of South Africa
Araneomorphae genera
Spiders of Africa
Zodariidae